Tom White is a 2004 film directed by Alkinos Tsilimidos.

Plot
Tom White is an architect who chooses to make himself homeless. Outwardly, he has all the signs of a successful life—large home, loving family, successful career. However, it soon becomes clear that not everything is as it appears at work. Tom consciously takes a different path and cuts ties with his normal life. He has chosen the streets, where those he meets, in spite of their position, have enormous self-dignity—the rent boy, an ex-junkie, a gentle-but-manly tramp and a 14-year-old graffiti artist. Tom goes on a personal journey of his own as he plumbs outsider society, yet he discovers his own dignity and gains an understanding of who he is.

Cast

Production

The film was scored by Paul Kelly and the Boon Companions: Dan Kelly, Dan Luscombe, Peter Luscombe and Bill MacDonald.

Release

The film was released in Australian cinemas on 19 August 2004 and played until 1 September 2004.  The film premiered on 31 July 2004 at the Melbourne International Film Festival. It was also screened at the Cannes Film Market on 13 May 2004; the Pusan International Film Festival (South Korea) on 10 October 2004; Australian Film Festival (Singapore) on 11 March 2005; the Commonwealth Film Festival (United Kingdom) on 4 May 2005 and at the Saint-Tropez Festival of the Antipodes (France) on 20 October 2005.

Reception 
Tom White received mixed critical reviews.

Awards 
 Winner  – Golden Tripod, Australian Cinematographers Society – 2004
 Winner – Inside Film (IF) Awards – Best Actor – Australia, 2004
 Winner – 3 Film Critics Circle of Australia Awards – Best Actor, Best Editing, Best Original Screenplay, Best Supporting Actor – Australia, 2004
 Nominated – 13 Australian Film Institute Awards including Best Film, Best Director, Best Original Screenplay, Best Actor, Best Supporting Actor, Best Supporting Actress, Best Cinematography – Australia, 2004
 Nominated – 5 Inside Film (IF) Awards including Best Film, Best Actress, Best Cinematography, Best Script – Australia, 2004
 Nominated – 6 Film Critics Circle of Australia Awards including Best Film, Best Director, Best Supporting Actor, Best Supporting Actress – Australia, 2004

Box office
Tom White grossed $277,234 at the box office in Australia.

See also
Cinema of Australia

References

External links

Tom White at the National Film and Sound Archive

2004 films
Australian drama films
Films scored by Paul Kelly (Australian musician)
Films shot in Melbourne
2004 drama films
2000s English-language films